Pandey Bechan Sharma, better known by his pen name Ugra ('extreme' or 'fierce', Hindi उग्र) (born Chunar, North-Western Provinces, 1900, died Delhi 1967) was an Indian writer noted for his provocative, usually satirical, journalism, fiction and autobiography.

Biography

Ugra's autobiography, Apni Khabar, gives a graphic account of his early life. Ugra was born into the very poor Brahmin family of Vaidyanath Pandey. Several of his siblings had died young, and his name Bechan means 'sold', given to him to avert this misfortune. Vaidyanath died when Ugra was a baby; the family suffered abuse from one of Ugra's two older brothers; and the children received only a patchy education. From about the age of eight Ugra followed in his brothers' footsteps in performing in the theatrical genre known as Ramlila, and his brother sent him to work in the theatre in Banaras, before taking him on tour as a child actor and as his servant.

Ugra devoted much of his energy to editing newspapers and magazines, though most were short-lived.

In 1924, he was imprisoned for nine months for editing the first issue of the newspaper Swadesh, opposing British rule: fleeing from Gorakhpur, he sought refuge first in Calcutta and then Bombay, where he was arrested. Upon release, he returned to Calcutta, editing the magazine Matvala until the 1928 controversy over his short-story collection Choklat, which led him to move to Bombay to work on silent films. Later, hounded by creditors, he moved to Indore, where he edited Vina and Swarajya. After getting into trouble there, he moved to Ujjain, where he edited Vikram. Finally, he settled in Delhi, where he died in 1967.

He never married.

Themes and style

Like most contemporary Indian writers, Ugra was committed to promoting both social reform and Indian independence from the British Empire. In the words of Ruth Vanita, "he delighted in iconoclasm; few writers of the time match his unsentimental depictions of the family, whether urban or rural, as a hotbed of violence, neglect, hatred, sexual depravity, and oppression"; "his fiction tends toward the didactic and generally has a social message. His writings champion the causes of nationalism, oppressed women, and lower castes, and critique corruption in high places, alcoholism, gambling, adultery, prostitution, and communalism."

His language straddled the conventions of Hindi and Urdu, in line with Gandhi's promotion of a unitary Indian language of 'Hindustani', and often included profane and colloquial language that had fallen from fashion in Indian writing during the Victorian period.

Publications on homosexuality

Ugra is particularly noted in Anglophone scholarship for his unusual willingness to discuss male homosexuality in his work. This contrasted with a tendency in India under British rule to downplay the existence of homosexuality. His first piece to do so, "Choklat" ("Chocolate") was published on 21 May 1924 in the magazine Matvala ("Intoxicated"). The story describes an illicit sexual relationship between Babu Dinkar Prasad, an upper-class Hindu man, and "a beautiful lad of thirteen of fourteen." Babu Dinkar Prasad is presented as a predatory character, forcing himself on young teenage boys and corrupting them with his homosexuality. The title of the story refers to "a name for those innocent, tender and beautiful boys of our country, whom society’s demons push into the mouth of destruction to quench their own desires."

"Choklat" was a sensation, eliciting polarized responses upon publication. Encouraged by the scandal he provoked, Ugra proceeded to publish a further four stories on the same theme over the next few months, and gathered them together in October 1927 with three more stories and other preparatory materials as a collection entitled Choklat. Ugra claimed that his representations of homoeroticism were intended to reveal and hence eradicate Indian homosexuality. Some readers, including M.K. Gandhi, concluded that Choklat was indeed acceptable because it warned against the dangers of homosexuality. However, many readers were scandalised that Ugra had discussed homosexuality at all, believing that by doing so, he was promoting it. Fellow nationalist Pandit Banarsidas Chaturvedi labelled Ugra's work as Ghasleti literature - that is, literature that relied on obscenity and scandal to appeal to readers. Alongside critics "were some homosexual men who were happy to find any representation of their lives, even a negative one."

The first edition of Choklat sold out swiftly, leading to a second edition, which sold out within six weeks of the publication of the first, followed by a third in 1953. The collection appeared in English translation by Ruth Vanita in 2006.

Works

Ugra's literary works include many short stories; two one-act plays and five full-length plays; four collections of verse; an autobiography, and ten novels.

Novels/Novellas

Cand hasīnoṁ ke khutūt (चंद हसीनों के ख़ुतूत) (Letters of Some Beautiful People) 1924
Raṅg Mahal (रंग महल) (Colour Palace) 1925
Dillī kā dalāl (दिल्ली का दलाल) (The Pimp of Delhi) 1927
Budhuā kī beṭī (बुधुआ की बेटी) 1928 
Sharābī (शराबी) (Drunkard) 1930
Sarkār tumhārī āṁkhoṁ meṁ (सरकार तुम्हारी आँखों में) 1937
Ghaṇṭā (घंटा) 1937
Gaṅgājal (गंगाजल) (Water of the Ganges) 1949
Kaḍhī meṁ koylā (कढ़ी में कोयला) 1955
Jī jī jī (जी जी जी) 1955
Phāgun ke din cār (फागुन के दिन चार) 1960
Juhū (जुहू) 1963
Gaṅgā mātā (गंगा माता) (Mother Ganges) 1972
Sabzbāgh (सब्ज़बाग़) 1979

Short Story Collections

Sosāiṭī āf ḍevils (सोसाइटी ऑफ़ डेविल्स) (Society of Devils) 1924
Cingāriyāṁ (चिनगारियाँ) (Sparks) 1925
Balātkār (बलात्कार) 1927
Cākleṭ (चाकलेट) (Chocolate) 1927
Nirlajjā (निर्लज्जा) 1927
Dozakh kī āg (दोज़ख़ की आग) (The Fires of Hell) 1928
Krāntikārī kahāniyāṁ (क्रान्तिकारी कहानियाँ) (Revolutionary Stories) 1939
Galpāñjali (गल्पांजलि) 1940
Reśmī (रेशमी) 1942
Pañjāb kī rānī (पंजाब की रानी) (Queen of Punjab) 1943
Sankī amīr (सनकी अमीर) 1952
Kalā kā puraskār (कला का पुरस्कार) (Art's Prize) 1954
Jab sārā ālam sotā hai (जब सारा आलम सोता है) (When the Whole World Sleeps) 1955

Plays/Satires

Mahātmā Īsā (महात्मा ईसा) (Great Soul Jesus) 1922
Lāl krānti ke pañje meṁ (लाल क्रान्ति के पंजे में) (In the Hands of the Red Revolution) 1924
Cār becāre (चार बेचारे) (Four Unfortunates) 1927
Ujbak (उजबक) 1928
Cumban (चुम्बन) (Kissing) 1937
Ḍikṭeṭar (डिक्टेटर) (Dictator) 1937
Gaṅgā kā beṭā (गंगा का बेटा) (Son of the Ganges) 1940
Āvārā (आवारा) (Vagabond) 1942
Anndātā Mādhav Mahārāj Mahān (अन्नदाता माधव महाराज महान) 1943
Naī pīṛhī (नई पीढ़ी) (New Generation) 1949

Miscellaneous Works

Dhruv carit (ध्रुव चरित) 1921
Ugra kā hāsya (उग्र का हास्य) 1939
Pārijātoṁ kā balidān (पारिजातों का बलिदान) 1942
Vyaktigat (व्यक्तिगत) 1954
Kañcan ghaṭ (कंचन घट) 1955
Apnī Khabar (अपनी खबर) (About Me) [autobiography] 1960
Fāil profāil (फ़ाइल प्रोफ़ाइल) (File Profile) [correspondence] 1966
Ghālib-Ugra (ग़ालिब-उग्र) (Ghalib-Ugra) [commentary] 1966

References

1900 births
1967 deaths
Indian Hindus
Indian male dramatists and playwrights
Indian male essayists
Indian male poets
20th-century Indian poets
20th-century Indian dramatists and playwrights
20th-century Indian essayists
20th-century Indian novelists
People from Mirzapur district
Writers from Uttar Pradesh
20th-century Indian male writers